Bethany Joan "Beth" Goldsmith (October 6, 1927 – October 24, 2004) was a pitcher who played from 1948 through 1950 in the All-American Girls Professional Baseball League.

Born in Elgin, Illinois, Goldsmith started playing sandlot ball with the boys of her neighborhood at age 12 and organized softball for the McGraw Electric team when she was a teenager. Charlene Barnett, a former teammate on the McGraw team who had joined the AAGPBL the previous year, advised Goldsmith to attend the next spring training of the league in Opa-locka, Florida. Primarily an outfielder, she attended the tryout and was converted into a pitcher on the strength of her arm and her quick overhand delivery. She then was assigned to the Kenosha Comets to start the 1948 season.

In her rookie year Goldsmith posted a 14–14 record and a 1.68 earned run average in 31 pitching appearances, striking out 117 batters in 245 innings of work. During the season, she hurled both games of a doubleheader against the Fort Wayne Daisies. She limited them to one hit in the opener but lost the game. Then she had better luck in the second game and was credited with the victory. In addition, she finished 11th in innings pitched and tied for 10th for the most strikeouts with Muskegon Lassies' Doris Sams.

Before the 1949 season, Goldsmith enjoyed a memorable experience during an AAGPBL tour of Central America, as the teams were feted by both government officials and the common people. In Nicaragua, she visited the presidential palace and was greeted by the then President Anastasio Somoza. That year, she went 8–11 with a 3.09 ERA in 29 games. Fourth place Kenosha advanced to the postseason, but lost to Muskegon in the best-of-three first round. In her only career playoff game, Goldsmith pitched two perfect innings of relief while striking out three. Goldsmith improved to 12–9 with a .368 ERA in 1950, her last season in the league. In all, she finished with 34–34 record and a 2.72 ERA in 87 games.

Following her baseball career, she worked for AT&T company for 30 years. After retiring in 1984, she attended AAGPBL Players Association reunions and enjoyed playing golf in her home of Orlando, Florida.

Goldsmith forms part of Women in Baseball, a permanent display based at the Baseball Hall of Fame and Museum in Cooperstown, New York, which was unveiled in 1988 to honor the entire All-American Girls Professional Baseball League.

Career statistics
Pitching

Batting 

Fielding

Sources

All-American Girls Professional Baseball League players
Kenosha Comets players
Baseball players from Illinois
Sportspeople from Elgin, Illinois
Baseball players from Orlando, Florida
1927 births
2004 deaths
Sportspeople from the Chicago metropolitan area
20th-century American women
20th-century American people
21st-century American women